Al-Zubayr ibn Abd al-Muttalib, was the son of Abd al-Muttalib and Fatima bint Amr, hence an uncle of Muhammad. He was full brother to Abu Talib and to Muhammad's father Abdullah.

Biography
He married Atika bint Abi Wahb of the Makhzum clan, and they had four daughters and one son.
Duba'a, who married Miqdad ibn Aswad and had Abd Allah ibn Miqdad and Karima bint Miqdad.
Umm al-Hakam (or Umm Hakim), who married Rabi'ah ibn al-Harith and had nine children.
Safiya.
Umm al-Zubayr.
Abd Allah.

After the death of his eldest half-brother, Al-Harith, Al-Zubayr was next in line. With his brother Abu Talib, he took responsibility for the family obligation to provide food and drink for the pilgrims. He also shared joint guardianship of the young Muhammad. It is said that he took Muhammad on a journey to Yemen c.584.

A tradition that Ibn Kathir calls "weak" states that he died c.585. This is contradicted by several traditions that indicate that he was still alive many years later.

Al-Zubayr was the founder of the order of chivalry known as the Hilf al-Fudul. This was a movement formed in Mecca in May 591 (soon after the end of the Sacrilegious War) for the suppression of violence and injustice. He is supposed to have said about the pact:

I swore, "Let’s make a pact against them, though we're all members of one tribe. We'll call it al-Fudul; if we make a pact by it, the stranger could overcome those under local protection, and those who go around the Kaaba will know that we reject injustice and will prevent all things shameful ... Al-Fudul made a pact and alliance that no evildoer shall dwell in Mecca's heart. This was a matter they firmly agreed; and so the protected neighbour and the unprotected stranger are safe among them."

Al-Zubayr was among the many Quraysh who participated in the rebuilding of the Kaaba in 605. At first they were afraid to commence, for a large snake took up residence in the sanctuary. One day an eagle carried off the snake, leaving the builders free to work. Al-Zubayr, very impressed by this, composed a poem describing how "down came the eagle, deadly straight in its swoop; it bore it away ..."

Notable relatives and family tree

See also
Zubayr (name)

References

External links 
 Zubair - , 
 Duba'ah - , 

Family of Muhammad
7th-century Arabs
Banu Hashim